General elections were held in Guyana on 5 October 1992. They were the first free and fair elections since 1964. The People's Progressive Party ended the People's National Congress' 28-year rule, winning 28 of the 53 seats and 53.5% of the vote following a landslide victory. Voter turnout was 80.4%.

Electoral system
The National Assembly had 65 members; 53 elected by proportional representation in a nationwide constituency, 10 appointed by the Regional Councils elected on the same date as the national members, and 2 appointed by the National Congress of Local Democratic Organs, an umbrella body representing the regional councils.

The President was elected by a first-past-the-post double simultaneous vote system, whereby each list nominated a presidential candidate and the presidential election itself was won by the candidate of the list having a plurality.

Results

References

Guyana
1992 in Guyana
Elections in Guyana